Cinzia Pellin (born 19 July 1973 in Velletri, Rome) is a contemporary Italian painter and set designer.

Art career
The women in Pellin's works are show and film stars or, often, fashion models. But also simply “women”, unaware stars of our time, who have nothing to do with video cameras or glossy magazines, but are the protagonists of real life; the choice of their faces is determined by the femininity, sensuality, perseverance or pain coming from their glances.

The detail of some glances painted on oversize canvases lets her suspended between the sweetness and violence of the contradictions of the time we are living. She has recently developed two new concepts. In the first, the face fades out thanks to play of shades, where it is only the eyes or the eyes and lips to stand out with bodily arrogance. In the second, she has tried to develop a technique between painting and drawing, with signs of grease pencil on oil paints.

Artistry
Pellin's artistry is best expressed in these words, Cinzia Pellin from some time, is going on a course tending to analyze more and more closer the female universe: a way of inner temper, a kaleidoscope full of charm and enticement, a planet dissected in a myriad of splinters, that get near and far, in the endless play of existence. (L. Guarino)

Solo exhibitions
Launch of the second show scheduled for Ferrara stage ALIENS July 2014, House of Ludovico Ariosto
Summer in Ferrara's license plate ALIENS - the alienating forms of contemporary June 2014, House of Ludovico Ariosto

References

Living people
1973 births
20th-century Italian women artists
21st-century Italian women artists
Artists from Rome
Accademia di Belle Arti di Napoli alumni